Jal Public Schools is a school district headquartered in Jal, New Mexico.

The district is entirely in Lea County and includes Jal.

History
In 2015 the school district voters approved a bond for $45,000,000 so the district could build new facilities.

Schools
It includes an elementary school (Jal Elementary School) and a combined junior-senior high school (Jal Junior-Senior High School).

The current elementary school, which has an open concept, opened in 2017. It had a cost of $15,000,000.

The former Burke Junior High School has  of space. In 2019 Jal city authorities chose to turn it into a new city hall, with that function using  of space in an eastern portion. This was under construction in 2021.

References

External links
 Jal Municipal Schools

School districts in New Mexico
Education in Lea County, New Mexico